Allium glomeratum is a Central Asian species of onion native to Xinjiang, Kyrgyzstan, Tajikistan, and Kazakhstan. It occurs at elevations of 1500–3000 m.

Allium glomeratum produces one round bulb up to 20 mm across. Scapes are up to 30 cm tall. Flowers are pale purple.

See also

 List of Allium species

References

glomeratum
Onions
Flora of temperate Asia
Plants described in 1930